Juan Condori is an album by  Argentine musician Dino Saluzzi recorded in 2005 and released on the ECM label.

Reception
The Allmusic review awarded by Thom Jurek awarded the album 4 stars stating "Juan Condori is one of those recordings where jazz, folk music, and improvisation all wind themselves into the notion of a complex but utterly beguiling song". The All About Jazz review by Budd Kopman stated "Juan Condori is one of the most heartfelt and deeply moving releases you will come across". The JazzTimes review by Bill Milkowski stated "This warm-hearted family affair stands as one of Saluzzi’s best".

Track listing
All compositions by Dino Saluzzi
 "La Vuelta de Pedro Orillas" - 8:44 
 "Milonga de Mis Amores" - 6:28 
 "Juan Condori" - 9:01 
 "Memoria" - 6:09 
 "La Parecida" - 4:51 
 "Inside" - 3:55 
 "Soles/La Camposanteña" - 7:22 
 "Las Cosas Amadas" - 6:07 
 "A Juana, Mi Madre" - 6:24 
 "Los Sauces" - 7:08 
 "Improvisacion" - 3:10 
 "Chiriguan" - 7:28 
Recorded in Buenos Aires in October 2005

Personnel
Dino Saluzzi — bandoneón
Felix ´Cuchara´ Saluzzi — tenor saxophone, soprano saxophone, clarinet
José Maria Saluzzi — acoustic guitar, electric guitar
Matias Saluzzi — double bass, bass guitar
U. T. Gandhi — drums, percussion

References

ECM Records albums
Dino Saluzzi albums
2006 albums
Albums produced by Manfred Eicher